Airag (also Khar-Airag, Hara-Ayrag, Kumis) is a sum (district) and town of Dornogovi Province in southeastern Mongolia. Airag sum center is a fluorspar mining settlement, the primary fluorspar mining and processing enterprises are at Bor-Öndör city (Khentii aimag). The railway station  connecting Bor-Öndör (60 km) via Airag to Ulan Bator and Beijing is at the sum center. In 2009, its population was 3,598.

References 

Districts of Dornogovi Province
Mining communities in Mongolia